Suicide in Sri Lanka is a common cause of unnatural death and a long term social issue. In the past, Sri Lanka had one of the highest suicide rates in the world. For several years before 2000, the suicide rate remained at 35 to 47 per 100,000 persons. The introduction in pesticide control regulations coincided with a reduction in suicide rates in Sri Lanka. Sri Lanka Federation for Suicide Prevention is an independent organisation working on suicide prevention in Sri Lanka.

Statistics 
According to a report published in a seminar by Dr Neil Fernando, head of the National Institute of Mental Health in September 2011, almost 4,000 people die by suicide in Sri Lanka every year. Fernando's statistics show the majority of victims were aged 15 to 44.
According to the statistics of the Registrar General's office, at the time of independence (1948) suicide rate in Sri Lanka was 9 per 100,000 people. In the 1970s, it rose up to 19 per 100,000, and in the mid-1980s, it reached 33 per 100,000. The latest statistics for Sri Lanka show a suicide rate of 15 per 100,000.

Suicide rate

Common methods 
Common methods of suicide include:
 Jumping in front of trains
 Drinking insecticides
 Hanging
 Jumping into deep water bodies
 Jumping from heights
 Using lethal firearms
 Drinking acids, fuels
 Drug overdose

See also 
 Suicide bombing in Sri Lanka

References 

Death in Sri Lanka
Sri Lanka